"Emergency on Planet Earth" is a song by British funk/acid jazz band Jamiroquai, released as the fourth and final single from their debut studio album of the same name (1993). The song was written by Jay Kay, and has an environmentalist tone, urging the listener to "stop modernisation going on." The track peaked at number 14 on the UK Singles Chart and at number four on the US Dance Chart.

A remix of the song, which uses a completely different bass track and intro, and includes some changes in the arrangements, was featured on the single, and in the music video for the song. This version was later released on the group's greatest hits compilation, High Times: Singles 1992–2006.

Composition
"Emergency on Planet Earth" is in the key of B flat major. Kay's voice in the song ranges in pitch from F4 to B5.

Critical reception
Larry Flick from Billboard wrote, "U.K. acid jazz/funk act is given a second shot at stateside acceptance with this house-fried throwdown." He added further, "Remixer Danny Tenaglia lays a crafty groove beneath the song that will work for discerning DJs, but maintains the integrity of the song and vocal. At a time when post-production seems to mean tossing out the entire track and starting all over, this is a nice change of pace. Deserves a shot." In his weekly UK chart commentary, James Masterton deemed it "another piece of soul-funk revival".

Alan Jones from Music Week rated it four out of five, noting, "A cinematic widescreen intro ushers in a typical but slightly more uptempo retro-funk workout, complete with period electronic squelching that lopes purposefully under some fine vocal emoting." James Hamilton from the RM Dance Update described it as "another uncompromisingly late Seventies style jazz-funk burbler". Tony Cross from Smash Hits also gave it four out of five, stating that "this is still strong stuff and the message is as important as the music - a green warrior that pop can be proud of."

Music video
The accompanying music video for the single was directed by W.I.Z. It features the members of Jamiroquai on a spaceship, resembling the Sith spaceship from Star Wars: A New Hope, receiving a video message from Kay, who is singing and dancing in the middle of nowhere. The video was published on YouTube in November 2009. It has amassed more than 3.9 million views as of November 2021.

Track listing
 UK CD single
 "Emergency on Planet Earth" – 3:39
 "Emergency on Planet Earth" (extended version) – 4:12
 "If I Like It, I Do It" (acoustic) – 4:26
 "Revolution 1993" (demo) – 10:19

Charts

References

1993 singles
1993 songs
Jamiroquai songs
S2 Records singles
Songs written by Jason Kay
Songs written by Toby Smith